Halsa may refer to:

Halsa, a municipality in Møre og Romsdal county, Norway
Halsa (also known as Halsanaustan), a village in Halsa Municipality, Møre og Romsdal county, Norway
Halsa Church, a church in Halsa Municipality, Møre og Romsdal county, Norway
Halsa, Nordland, a village in Meløy Municipality, Nordland county, Norway
Halsa Church (Meløy), a church in Meløy Municipality, Nordland county, Norway

See also
Halsafjorden, a fjord in Møre og Romsdal, Norway